Children and Youth International, formerly Rio+twenties, is a non-governmental youth-led and volunteer based youth empowerment organization based in Brussels, Belgium, New York, USA and Brighton, UK. Its goal is to "build capacity and empower young people and their representative structures to actively participate in the preparatory processes of the UN Conference on Sustainable Development (UNCSD) in Rio in 2012 (Rio+20)". It was founded by Ben Vanpeperstraete, Ivana Savic, Michaela Hogenboom, Pieter-Jan Van De Velde, Felix Beck, Brendan Coolsaet, Sébastien Duyck with the involvement and later leadership of Lloyd Russell-Moyle who later became a British member of parliament.

The organization has started to serve as the Organising Partner of the Major Group for Children and Youth during the United Nations Conference on Sustainable Development.

Within the international community working on sustainable development and the Rio+20 Conference, Rio+twenties is known for its capacity building initiatives focussing on youth, such as the "Rio+20 Participation Guide for Children and Youth" and the "Rio+20: an introduction for children and youth" animation movie. In cooperation with other youth organizations, the Participation Guide, originally in English, was translated into four other official UN languages, and made available through the organization's website.

Board
The current board are:

 Mai Thin Yu Mon - Myanmar
 Bitania Lulu Berhanu (Chair Governance Committee) - Ethiopia
 Karol Alejandra Arambula Carrillo - Mexico
 Sharon Lo	(Chair Grievance Committee) - UK
 Anna-Theresia Ekman - Sweden
 Zephanii Smith Eisenstat - USA 
 Mary Kate Costello	(Chair) - USA
 Sajith Wijesuriya - Sri Lanka
 Carson Kiburo Kibett - Kenya
 Zoe Carletide - UK
 Regine Guevara	(Treasurer) - Philippines
 Roman Chukov	(Vice Chair) - Russia
 Bubacarr Singhateh	(Secretary) - Gambia
 Yolanda Jacob - USA
 Rohit Pothukuchi - India
 Anja Olin Pape - Sweden
 Elisa Novoa - Colombia
 Alex Wang - China
 Sam Loni - Iran
 Luiza Drummond Veado - USA
 Ruxanda Renita	(Chair Fundraising Committee) - Moldova
 Donovan Guttieres - France
 Moa Herrgard - Sweden
 Jolly Amatya - Nepal 
 Aashish Khullar - India
 Khaled Eman	(Representative of Secretariat) - Egypt

See also
 Youth empowerment
 United Nations Conference on Sustainable Development
 List of youth empowerment organizations

References

External links
 Major Group for Children and Youth

Youth empowerment organizations
Youth organisations based in England
Youth rights